Richard Marsden Pankhurst (1834 – 5 July 1898) was an English barrister and socialist who was a strong supporter of women's rights.

Early life
Richard Pankhurst was the son of Henry Francis Pankhurst (1806–1873) and Margaret Marsden (1803–1879). Pankhurst was born in Stoke but spent most of his life in Manchester and London. He was educated at Manchester Grammar School and Owens College of Manchester. In 1858 he graduated B.A. from the University of London and in 1859 was awarded LL.B. with Honours. In 1863 he graduated LL.D. with gold medal.

Career
He was called to the Bar at Lincoln's Inn in 1867 and joined the Northern Assizes circuit. He was also a member of the Bar of the County Palatine of Lancaster Court.

Following qualification he was a founder member of the Manchester Liberal Association, although he was subsequently to fall out with the Liberals.  He campaigned for multiple causes, including free speech, universal free secular education, republicanism, home rule for the Irish, independence for India, nationalisation of land, the disestablishment of the Church of England and the abolition of the House of Lords.  He established a National Society for Women's Suffrage, drafted the Women's Disabilities Removal Bill (the first women's suffrage bill in England) and was author of the bill which became the Married Women's Property Act 1882 which gave wives absolute control over their property and earnings.

He married Emmeline Goulden, better known as Emmeline Pankhurst, who was some 24 years younger than he was, in 1878. With her, he was instrumental in establishing the Independent Labour Party.  Together they formed the Women's Franchise League in 1889.  They were part of a political circle which included Keir Hardie, Annie Besant, William Morris and George Bernard Shaw.  They were present at the Bloody Sunday riot in Trafalgar Square.

Known as the "Red Doctor", he stood for Parliament in 1883 as candidate for Manchester and in 1885 for Rotherhithe, Surrey, both times unsuccessfully.  His controversial views did not win him many clients, but did afford him a place of great respect in the Independent Labour Party, even long after his sudden death, from stomach ulcers, at the age of 64.

He was buried alongside his parents in Brooklands Cemetery, Sale, Cheshire, where there is a headstone bearing their names.

Personal life
With his wife Emmeline, he was father to five children: Christabel Pankhurst (1880–1958), Sylvia Pankhurst (1882–1960), Francis Henry (1884–1888), Adela Pankhurst (1885–1961), and Henry Francis (1889–1910). His daughters all became suffragettes. Through his daughter Sylvia, he is the great-grandfather of Helen Pankhurst and grandfather of Richard Pankhurst, who shares his name.

Sayings
"Life is nothing without enthusiasms"
"Every struggling cause shall be ours"
[The House of Lords is] "a public abattoir butchering the liberties of the people"
[The clergy of the Church of England are] "a portentious [sic?] beadledom"

References 
Manchester Faces and Places Vol 4 Page 33 (1893)
Burton, S: "Relatively Famous: Richard Pankhurst, The Red Doctor", BBC History Magazine, February 2007, 8:2, page 22.

1830s births
1898 deaths
Alumni of the University of London
Deaths from ulcers
English agnostics
English barristers
Independent Labour Party National Administrative Committee members
People educated at Manchester Grammar School
People from Stoke-on-Trent
Independent Labour Party politicians
Richard
English socialist feminists